LCIII or variation, may refer to:

 Macintosh LC III, 1990s Apple personal computer
 Late Cypriot III (LCIII), a period of the Mediterranean Bronze Age
 LC III pelvic fracture in the Young-Burgess classification
 Local Council III (LCIII), a type of local administration in Uganda; see Local Council (Uganda)
 Creative Playthings LCIII, an educational toy modular electronics experiment kit, based on the Raytheon Lectron
 Praga LC-III (aircraft), see List of aircraft (Pi - Pz)

See also

 LC3 (disambiguation)
 LCII (disambiguation)
 LCI (disambiguation)